Jonatan Cerrada Moreno (born 12 September 1985) is a Belgian singer. He won the first season of Nouvelle Star (the French edition of Pop Idol) in 2003 and represented France in the Eurovision Song Contest 2004.

Personal life
Jonatan Cerrada Moreno was born in Liège, Belgium, and grew up in Ans with his four siblings (Julien, Rafaël, Audrey and Rachel) and his Spanish parents María Victoria Moreno, a secretary, and Valentín Cerrada, a mechanical technician. He was eight years old when he entered the Opéra Royal de Wallonie in Liège where he stayed until age fourteen. He speaks fluent French, Spanish, English and basic Indonesian. He currently lives in Bali.

Professional career
Cerrada won the first season of Nouvelle Star in 2003. Soon after winning the competition, he released his debut single "Je voulais te dire que je t'attends", a revival of a song originally by Michel Jonasz, and then "Rien ne me changera". His debut album, Siempre 23, was released after that and was successful across France and Belgium. Cerrada represented France in the Eurovision Song Contest 2004 singing a power ballad song, "À chaque pas", and came 15th out of 24 finalist countries.

Cerrada was invited to star as a guest in the Spanish comedy/drama Un Paso Adelante, which also aired in France with French dubbing, and he dubbed his own lines.

Cerrada sang the soundtrack for the French edition of the film Robots – "Mon Paradis". Soon after that, his second album La Preuve du contraire was released. In September 2005, "Libre comme l'air" was released only in Belgium. In March 2006, it was confirmed his next single was to be "Ne m'en veux pas" which appeared on La Preuve du contraire as a duet with Ophélie Cassy.  A new solo version was recorded but was never released. In February 2007, a year after his latest single "Ruban noir" (from La Preuve du contraire) became a major download hit without any specific promotion. It is sung partly in Spanish and is about the 11 March 2004 Madrid train bombings. In June/July 2007, he took the title role of Arthur Rimbaud in the semi-staged comedy musical Rimbaud, written by Richard Charest & Arnaud Kerane

Cerrada is no longer signed by the major record label that released his first two French albums. Instead, he started working on a Spanish album as independently. In May 2007, he created a new Myspace site Tercero, showcasing songs, all sung in Spanish, with a distinct Latin and R&B style. In July 2007, he signed up to the Sellaband website aiming to find "believers" willing to buy "parts" (funding) the recording of his third album.  Regularly appearing in the top three of Sellaband's charts, he managed to collect $25,000 (half of the required $50,000), before deciding to leave the website in October 2007. He stated that even though he had written the lyrics, he was not the composer of his proposed songs. The composer did not wish to give a percentage of earnings to Sellaband and was unwilling to proceed.  His Sellaband blog also revealed his disappointment at being dropped by a major record company.  On Sellaband, his profile, blog, and updates were in English.

In January 2018, Cerrada released an Indonesian single entitled "Lelaki Lain Di Hati", written by Valiant Budi Yogi or well known as Vabyo. He felt challenged after his friend offered him to sing Indonesian song. This song became popular in Indonesia because it is rare for a foreign singer to release an Indonesian single.

Discography

Albums

Other releases
Tercero, previously collected believers for this project on Sellaband.

Singles

Other releases
"Mon Paradis" (download only)
Ne m'en veux pas" (promo only)
"Lelaki Lain Di Hati" (2018)

Filmography
 2018 : Liam dan Laila : Liam

References

External links

Jonatan Cerrada Official Site
Jonatan Cerrada's Myspace (French & English)
Jonatan Cerrada's Tercero Myspace (French)
Jonatan Cerrada's Sellaband page (English)
Jonatan Cerrada Official Fan Club (French & Spanish)
Largest Jonatan Cerrada Fan Site (French)

1985 births
Living people
Belgian people of Spanish descent
Belgian pop singers
Eurovision Song Contest entrants of 2004
Eurovision Song Contest entrants for France
French-language singers of Belgium
Nouvelle Star winners
Musicians from Liège
Walloon musicians
21st-century Belgian male singers
21st-century Belgian singers